Poltava University of Economics and Trade (PUET) is one of the biggest universities in Poltava, Ukraine.

History 
The University started in 1961 as a teaching and consultation center. In 1968 it became a department and soon – in 1970 a branch of Lviv Trade and Economics Institute.

In 1974 Poltava Cooperative Institute was established.

The first president Dianich M. M. (1970—1987).

The second president Victor A. Dorokhin (1987—2003).

in 1996 the Institute introduced a training program for Bachelors in the following fields: Economics and Entrepreneurship, Management, Trade, Food Technology and Engineering.

In the early 90s institute started postgraduate education. For this purpose, Interdisciplinary Institute for advanced training of specialists of Consumer Cooperatives was opened in Poltava Cooperative Institute. In 1997, the Institute has been accredited by the Accreditation level 3. Ministry of Education of Ukraine during 1998 awarded the institute with appropriate licenses and certificates.

May 21, 2001 was created Poltava University of Consumer Cooperatives in Ukraine.

In 2003 Alexey A. Nestulya became the president.

During this period, the university began to grow rapidly and enhance its reputation. In the same year the university started training professionals in the fields — Economic Cybernetics, Banking and Social Informatics.  In 2006 — Personnel Management and Labour Economics and in 2007 — Hotel and Restaurant Business.

In 2009 the University was accredited again and it was awarded the fourth — the highest level. Licensed numbers of students in all majors are: for full-time studies — up to 2700 people and for correspondence studies - up to 6100 people.

In April 2010 university changed its name to Poltava University of Economics and Trade.

In 2012 the university was included in the top ten economic university in Ukraine.

In 2013 opened Distance Education Center.

Faculty 
 Economics, Management and Information Technology
 Commodities, Trade and Marketing
 Food Technology, Hotel, Restaurant and Tourism Business

Schools 
 International Economics
 Banking
 Biotechnology
 Documentation and Information Activities
 Informatics
 Marketing
 Management of Organizations
 Hotel and Restaurant Business
 Food Technology
 Law
 Commodity and Commercial Activities
 Commodity and Expertise in Customs
 Tourism
 Personnel Management and Labour Economics
 Accounting and Auditing
 Philology
 Finance and Credit
 Enterprise Economics
 Economic Cybernetics

University today 

More than 300 students arrived from 20 countries to choose PUET as the foundation of their future career.
 The university has students from many different countries: Ukraine, Azerbaijan, Moldova, Turkmenistan, Turkey, China, Nigeria, India

Sports 
In 1983 the football team of the university participated in the 1983 KFK Ukrainian competitions as Kooperator Poltava.

See also 
 Kyiv National University of Trade and Economics

References

External links 
 

Universities in Ukraine
Universities of economics in Europe
1961 establishments in Ukraine